The 2022 Georgia Tech Yellow Jackets football team represented the Georgia Institute of Technology during the 2022 NCAA Division I FBS football season. The Yellow Jackets played their home games at Bobby Dodd Stadium in Atlanta, Georgia, and competed as members of the Atlantic Coast Conference. They were led by interim head coach Brent Key.

Offseason 
Georgia Tech had a tumultuous offseason. After an embarrassing 3–9 record in 2021, Geoff Collins made changes to his staff on both sides of the ball. Brought in were Chip Long as Offensive Coordinator, Del Alexander as Wide Receivers coach,  Mike Daniels as Running Backs coach, Chris Weinke as Quarterbacks coach,  David Turner as Defensive Run Game Coordinator, and Travares Tillman as Defensive Backs coach.

New uniforms
On July 18 the Yellow Jackets revealed a refreshed uniform set. The uniforms were made in partnership with Adidas who has provided Tech with uniforms and apparel since 2018. The uniforms are more traditional than the previous set, with design elements that taken from previous sets of Yellow Jacket football uniforms. There are three jerseys, white, navy, and a gold alternate. The white tops feature gold numbers with a thin navy outline, which is reminiscent of uniforms worn in the late 90's and early 00's. The navy tops have white numerals with a gold outline, which is different from the previous set that featured gold numbers with no outline. The navy uniforms appear to be a call back to the uniforms Tech wore from 1987 to 1995 which are remembered for winning the 1990 National Championship. The third jersey Tech introduced is gold with navy blue numbers. Tech has worn gold tops from time to time since the late 60's. It is unapparent if they will be paired with a white helmet or Tech's traditional gold helmet. The jerseys will feature numbers on the shoulders for the first time since 2017. The uniforms have three pant options in the same colors. The bottoms feature a stripe design that Tech used on its pants from 1987 to 2007. Tech revealed the uniforms with videos featuring voiceovers from past legends Joe Hamilton and Darren Waller.

Death of Demaryius Thomas
Georgia Tech faithful mourned the loss of former star wide receiver Demaryius Thomas who died on December 9, 2021, at age 33. Thomas played at Tech from 2006 through 2009 and was First-team All-ACC his redshirt junior year. After college Thomas had a lengthy NFL career. His most notable time in the league was with the Denver Broncos where he was a 4x Pro Bowler and made Second-team All-Pro twice. Thomas also won Super Bowl 50 with Denver. Thomas was affectionately nicknamed “Bay Bay”. he was given the nickname by his uncle in reference to the bad kids from the movie Bébé's Kids. Thomas's celebration of life was held at McCamish Pavilion on December 20. Friends, former teammates, and fans attended the event.

On April 27, 2022, Georgia Tech and the PeyBack Foundation, which is run by Thomas's former teammate Peyton Manning announced the Demaryius A. Thomas Scholarship Endowment. The Demaryius A. Thomas Scholarship Endowment endows academic scholarships to attend Georgia Tech for incoming freshmen students from Laurens County, Georgia, Thomas's hometown. In addition to this, Georgia Tech announced that August 8 would be annually recognized as “Demaryius Thomas Day”.

Coaching Change
On September 26, 2022, following the team's 3rd loss of the season in 4 games, Coach Geoff Collins and Athletics Director Todd Stansbury were relieved of their duties. Former GT football alum Brent Key was named as interim coach.

Schedule
Georgia Tech announced its 2022 football schedule on February 1, 2022. The 2022 schedule consisted of five home games, six away games and a neutral-site game in the regular season. The Yellow Jackets  hosted ACC foes Duke, Virginia, and Miami and traveled to Pitt, Florida State, Virginia Tech and North Carolina. They played Clemson in a neutral-site game at the Mercedes-Benz Stadium in Atlanta, Georgia.

The Yellow Jackets hosted two of their non-conference opponents, Western Carolina from the Division I FCS and Ole Miss from the SEC. They visited UCF from the AAC and Georgia from the SEC.

Sports Illustrated ranked Georgia Tech's schedule the 18th most difficult for the 2022 NCAA college football season.

Game summaries

vs No. 4 Clemson

Western Carolina

#20 Ole Miss

at UCF

at #24 Pitt

Duke

Coaching staff

Rankings

References

Georgia Tech
Georgia Tech Yellow Jackets football seasons
Georgia Tech Yellow Jackets football